Cameron County, officially the County of Cameron, is the southernmost county in the U.S. state of Texas. As of the 2020 census, its population was 421,017. Its county seat is Brownsville.

The county was founded in 1848 and is named for Captain Ewen Cameron, a soldier during the Texas Revolution and in the ill-fated Mier Expedition. During the later 19th century and through World War II, Fort Brown was a US Army outpost here, stimulating the development of the city of Brownsville.

Cameron County comprises the Brownsville–Harlingen, TX metropolitan statistical area, as well as the Brownsville–Harlingen–Raymondville combined statistical area, which itself is part of the larger Rio Grande Valley region.

Geography
To the east, the county borders the Gulf of Mexico.

Major highways
  Interstate 2
   Interstate 69E/U.S. Highway 77
   Interstate 169/State Highway 550
  U.S. Highway 83
  U.S. Highway 281
  State Highway 4
  State Highway 48
  State Highway 100
  State Highway 107
  State Highway 345

Adjacent counties and municipalities
 Willacy County (north)
 Gulf of Mexico (east)
 Matamoros Municipality, Tamaulipas, Mexico (south)
 Hidalgo County (west)

National protected areas
 Laguna Atascosa National Wildlife Refuge (part)
 Lower Rio Grande Valley National Wildlife Refuge (part)
 Palo Alto Battlefield National Historical Park

Demographics

Note: the US Census treats Hispanic/Latino as an ethnic category. This table excludes Latinos from the racial categories and assigns them to a separate category. Hispanics/Latinos can be of any race.

As of the census of 2010, 406,220 people, 119,631 households, and 96,579 families were residing in the county. The population density was 370 people per square mile (143/km2). The 141,924 housing units averaged 132 per square mile (51/km2). The racial makeup of the county was 87.0% White, 0.5% African American, 0.4% Native American, 0.7% Asian, 9.8% from other races, and 1.5% from two or more races. About 88.1% of the population was Hispanic or Latino of any race.

Of the 119,631 households, 50.3% had children under the age of 18 living with them, 60.80% were married couples living together, 20.0% had a female householder with no husband present, and 19.3% were not families. About 16.40% of all households were made up of individuals, and 7.30% had someone living alone who was 65 years of age or older. The average household size was 3.36, and the average family size was 3.80.

In the county, the age distribution was 33.0% under the age of18, 9.7% from 18 to 24, 25.6% from 25 to 44, 20.6% from 45 to 64, and 11.10% who were 65 or older. The median age was 30.6 years. For every 100 females, there were 91.90 males. For every 100 females aged 18 and over, there were 86.30 males.

The median income for a household in the county was $31,264, and for a family was $33,770. Males had a median income of $21,410 versus $15,597 for females. The per capita income for the county was $13,695. About 30.0% of families and 34.7% of the population were below the poverty line, including 46.8% of those under age 18 and 24.8% of those age 65 or over.

A 2000 Texas A&M study stated that of the residents of Cameron County, 43% do not have basic literacy skills.

Within the 2010s decade, a noticeable trend in the county population showed that growth among the county's northern cities (defined as major towns whose city limits lie entirely north or east of U.S. Highway 83 in the county) on average has been greater than those cities on U.S. Highway 83 in the county, suggesting a possible desire among both locals and new residents from outside the Rio Grande Valley to move away from the population centers of the county. This trend has also been shared by nearby Hidalgo County.  Los Fresnos, for example, grew by 42.2% from 2010 to 2018. Other major cities, such as Indian Lake, Primera, and Rio Hondo, all grew by more than 15% in the same period. In contrast, the cities of Harlingen, La Feria, and San Benito, all cities along U.S. Highway 83, have seen growths less than 1% in the same period. The city that grew the most among the Highway 83 cities in the county was Brownsville, which grew by 4.4% from 2010 to 2019.

Government and infrastructure
U.S. Immigration and Customs Enforcement operates the Port Isabel Service Processing Center, located in an unincorporated area adjacent to the Port Isabel-Cameron County Airport, which is itself owned and operated by the county. The airport has four runways and offers fuel and other general aviation services.

U.S. District Judge Andrew S. Hanen stated in 2013 that the corruption in the county judiciary and legal system was so pervasive that most people would not believe it "unless they heard it themselves."

Politics
Cameron County leans toward the Democratic Party in presidential elections. The last Republican to win the county was George W. Bush in 2004. Donald Trump's 2016 showing of 32.0% was the lowest received by a Republican candidate in the county since Alf Landon in 1936. However in 2020, Trump's performance of 43% was the best for a Republican in the county since 2004.

As of 2006, officeholders tend to be Democrats.  As of 2006, about 20,000 to 30,000 people in Cameron County vote in primary elections, and presidential elections have higher turnouts. Politiqueras, women hired to help elderly people vote, are crucial in South Texas elections.

Education
Cameron County is served by several school districts. They include:
 Brownsville Independent School District
 Harlingen Consolidated Independent School District
 La Feria Independent School District
 Los Fresnos Consolidated Independent School District
 Lyford Consolidated Independent School District (partially)
 Point Isabel Independent School District
 Rio Hondo Independent School District
 San Benito Consolidated Independent School District
 Santa Maria Independent School District
 Santa Rosa Independent School District

In addition, residents are eligible to apply to South Texas Independent School District's magnet schools.

All of the county is in the service area of Texas Southmost College.

Economy
SpaceX has been approved by the FAA to build a private spaceport east of Brownsville on the Gulf Coast. 
The SpaceX South Texas Launch Site is projected to employ 75–100 full-time workers in the early years with up to 150 full-time employees/contractors by 2019.  In 2014, SpaceX acquired additional land near Boca Chica, which they consolidated into a subdivision called "Mars Crossing", possibly named after the novel by science-fiction writer Geoffrey A. Landis.

The Southern Cattle Tick (Rhipicephalus microplus) is invasive here. Populations here have also become highly permethrin resistant. In 2014 the problem had become so severe that spread to neighboring counties was feared, and a Temporary Preventative Quarantine Area was established to preserve efficacy in those counties. All quarantine efforts have been somewhat unsuccessful, due at least in part to the ticks' infestation of wildlife including whitetail (Odocoileus virginianus).

Media

Radio stations
 KFRQ 94.5FM
 KKPS 99.5FM
 KNVO 101.1FM
 KVLY 107.9FM
 KVMV 96.9FM

Newspapers
 The Brownsville Herald (A Freedom Communications, Inc. newspaper based in Brownsville, TX)
 Valley Morning Star (A Freedom Communications, Inc. newspaper based in Harlingen, TX)
 El Nuevo Heraldo (AIM Media Texas newspaper based in Brownsville, TX)

Communities

Cities

 Brownsville (county seat)
 Harlingen
 La Feria
 Los Fresnos
 Palm Valley
 Port Isabel
 Rio Hondo
 San Benito

Towns

 Bayview
 Combes
 Indian Lake
 Laguna Vista
 Los Indios
 Primera
 Rancho Viejo
 Santa Rosa
 South Padre Island

Village
 Rangerville

Census-designated places

 Arroyo Colorado Estates
 Arroyo Gardens
 Bixby
 Bluetown
 Cameron Park
 Chula Vista
 Del Mar Heights
 El Camino Angosto
 Encantada-Ranchito-El Calaboz
 Grand Acres (former)
 Green Valley Farms
 Iglesia Antigua
 Juarez
 La Feria North
 La Paloma
 La Tina Ranch
 Lago
 Laguna Heights
 Las Palmas II
 Lasana
 Laureles
 Lozano
 Olmito
 Orason
 Palmer
 Ratamosa
 Reid Hope King
 Rice Tracts
 San Pedro
 Santa Maria
 Solis
 South Point
 Tierra Bonita
 Villa del Sol
 Villa Pancho
 Yznaga

Other unincorporated communities
 Arroyo City
 Boca Chica Village (to be incorporated as "Starbase")

Ghost town
 Santa Rita

See also

 List of museums in the Texas Gulf Coast
 National Register of Historic Places listings in Cameron County, Texas
 Recorded Texas Historic Landmarks in Cameron County

References

External links

 
 Cameron County at Texas State Historical Association

 
1848 establishments in Texas
Populated places established in 1848
Lower Rio Grande Valley
Majority-minority counties in Texas
Hispanic and Latino American culture in Texas